The Langley Ukulele Ensemble is a ukulele ensemble from Langley, British Columbia in Canada. The ensemble is internationally renowned and considered to be one of the top ukulele performing ensembles in the world. They were prominently featured in the 2008 award-winning document film, Mighty Uke. The group is composed of 20 musicians, aged twelve to eighteen years, who perform 50-80 concerts a year. The group was originated in 1981 by Peter Loungo using the J. Chalmers Doane's musical program in the 1970s that reached over 50,000 students across Canada and the United States. They have performed in Canada, Florida, Texas, California, Nevada, the Pacific Northwest, Japan and Hawaii. The ensemble was named Langley's Entertainer of the Year for 2005, and Musical Director Peter Luongo was named Langley's Leader of the Year for that same year.

Tours
Since 1985, the Ensemble has been traveling to Hawaii every July as part of their annual tour. During their stay there, they are sponsored by the Sheraton Waikiki. In addition to performances at the hotel, they play at schools and Rotary Clubs in Hawaii. 

In summer 2007, the Ensemble participated in the Royal Nova Scotia International Tattoo in Halifax, and opened at the Stratford, Ontario Summer Music Festival. In 2013 they were invited back and performed once again at the Royal Nova Scotia International Tattoo.

In addition to their annual tour to Hawaii, in October 2009 they were the headline performers at the 3rd International Ukulele Ceilidh in Nova Scotia, Canada.

In 2015 they paid a return visit to perform on the River Avon at the Stratford Summer Music Festival, and then traveled to perform on the International Stage at the Canadian National Exhibition in Toronto.

The Langley Ukulele Ensemble is one of the featured groups in Mighty Uke: The Amazing Comeback of an Underdog. The documentary includes following the ensemble on their annual Hawaiian trip.

Peter Luongo has been replaced by his son, Paul Luongo, as the musical director of the Ensemble upon Peter's retirement in 2013.  Paul is an alumnus of the Ensemble.

Alumni
Alumni of the Langley Ukulele Ensemble include James Hill, who pursued a career as a solo artist and was described by Stuart McLean of the Canadian Broadcasting Corporation as the "Wayne Gretzky of Ukulele".

Other alumni include Paul Luongo (the ensemble's current director), Elizabeth Zielke (current director of the junior ensembles), and acoustic group Exit 58.

The alumni continue to meet and perform together under the direction of Peter Luongo.

Discography
The Ensemble has released fourteen recordings on CD, some of which are sung in the Hawaiian language. Musical styles include Classical, Jazz, Gospel, Rock and Roll and international music.
 Langley Our Home, Precision Sound (1998) ASIN: B0000C1W2R
 Our Hawaiian Heart, Precision Sound (1999) ASIN: B0000C1W2S
 20th Anniversary Commemorative Edition Ukulele Family Album (2000)
 I'll Be Home For Christmas (2000)
 The Enchanted Ukulele, Precision Sound (2000) ASIN: B0000C1W2U
 Cruisin' Ukuleles, Precision Sound (2001) ASIN: B0000C1W2W
 Ukulele: The Legend Continues, (2002) ASIN: B0000C1W2X
 The Pacific Ukulele Connection, (2004) ASIN: B0002EXKHE
 Strings Attached (2004)
 25th Anniversary Ukulele Celebration (2005)
 Ukulele Christmas (2005)
 Our Hawaiian Heart Anniversary Edition (2009)
 Langley Ukulele - Live in Concert DVD (2010)
 Ukulele Rock 'n Roll Review (2013)

References

External links
Langley Ukulele Ensemble official website
James Hill

Mandolin orchestras
Musical groups established in 1980
Musical groups from British Columbia
Canadian ukulele players
1980 establishments in British Columbia